The Men's team pursuit competition at the 2017 World Single Distances Speed Skating Championships was held on 10 February 2017.

Results
The race started at 19:41.

References

Men's team pursuit